The 6th Army was a Royal Yugoslav Army formation which commanded six divisions during the German-led Axis invasion of the Kingdom of Yugoslavia in April 1941 during World War II. It was commanded by General Dimitrije Živković, and it was deployed around Belgrade and in the Banat region east of the Tisza . It held two infantry divisions in reserve in the lower Morava valley.

Notes

References
 

Field armies of the Kingdom of Yugoslavia
Military units and formations of Yugoslavia in World War II
Military units and formations disestablished in 1941
Military units and formations established in 1941